Lauridia is a genus of flowering plants belonging to the family Celastraceae.

Its native range is Southern Africa.

Species:

Lauridia reticulata 
Lauridia tetragona

References

Celastraceae
Celastrales genera